Antoine Verdu (11 May 1915 – 14 March 2002) was a French weightlifter. He competed in the men's featherweight event at the 1936 Summer Olympics.

References

External links
 

1915 births
2002 deaths
French male weightlifters
Olympic weightlifters of France
Weightlifters at the 1936 Summer Olympics
Place of birth missing
20th-century French people